The crowned hornbill (Lophoceros alboterminatus) is an African hornbill.

Description 
It is a medium-sized bird,  in length, and is characterized by its white belly and black back and wings. The tips of the long tail feathers are white. The eyes are yellow; the beak is red and presents a stocky casque on the upper mandible.  In females, the casque is smaller. The crowned hornbill can be distinguished from the similar Bradfield's hornbill by its shorter beak.

Habitat 
The crowned hornbill is a common resident of the coastal and riverine forests of southern (only the eastern coast) to northeastern Africa.

Diet 
It forages mainly in trees, where it feeds on insects (often caught in flight), small rodents, small reptiles, eggs, seeds and fruits. This hornbill species can be seen in flocks, usually in the dry season. Four to five white eggs are incubated for 25 to 30 days; the juveniles remain with both parents for about 8 weeks.

References

 Gordon Lindsay Maclean, Robert's Birds of South Africa, 6th Edition

External links 

Hornbills
Lophoceros
Birds of Sub-Saharan Africa
Birds described in 1889
Taxa named by Johann Büttikofer